Archduchess Marie-Astrid of Austria (born Princess Marie-Astrid of Luxembourg on 17 February 1954) is the elder daughter and eldest child of Jean, Grand Duke of Luxembourg, and Princess Joséphine-Charlotte of Belgium, and the wife of Archduke Carl Christian of Austria, grandson of the last Austrian Emperor, Karl I.

Biography
Princess Marie-Astrid was born on 17 February 1954, in Castle Betzdorf, Betzdorf, Luxembourg. She is the eldest child of Jean, then Hereditary Grand Duke of Luxembourg, and Princess Joséphine-Charlotte of Belgium. Her godparents were King Leopold III of Belgium (her maternal grandfather) and Grand Duchess Charlotte of Luxembourg (her paternal grandmother).

The princess was named Marie-Astrid in honour of the Virgin Mary and her maternal grandmother the Queen of the Belgians born Astrid of Sweden who died tragically in 1935. She is the niece of the Kings King Baudouin and King Albert II as well as the cousin of the current King of the Belgians King Philippe.

In her youth, as one of the few eligible princesses from European reigning houses, she was considered an ideal candidate by match makers for marriage to Charles, Prince of Wales. Media reports in the 1970s speculated about the prospects of such a marriage, the Daily Express claiming in June 1977 that the couple's engagement was imminent. (Unconfirmed media reports in the British press claimed that Pope Paul VI had prevented a marriage by refusing under Ne Temere to accept that the children of the couple could not be brought up Roman Catholic.)

It has been since suggested that the marriage rumours were a result of efforts to detect a leaker in the Privy Council. In reality, a marriage between the British heir and the Roman Catholic princess was unlikely, as the terms of the Act of Settlement 1701 needed to be repealed or modified.

Marie-Astrid studied in Luxembourg and also in Belgium. She received her diploma as a registered nurse in 1974, and finished her education in 1977, with a nursing certificate in tropical medicine from the Prince Leopold Institute.

She has been the president of the Red Cross for Luxembourg Youth since 1970.

Marriage
On 6 February 1982 in Luxembourg, she married her second cousin Archduke Carl Christian of Austria, younger son of Archduke Carl Ludwig of Austria (himself the fourth son of Emperor Charles I of Austria) and his wife Princess Yolande of Ligne, of the prominent Belgian noble family, the House of Ligne). 

They have five children: 
 Archduchess Marie-Christine Anne Astrid Zita Charlotte of Austria (b. 31 July 1983, Brussels, Belgium). She was baptized in the Saint Anne Chapel in the Church of Val-Duchesse in Belgium Auferghem. Her godparents were Archduke Rudolf of Austria (her father's uncle) and Princess Astrid of Belgium, later Archduchess of Austria-Este (her mother's cousin). She was given the names of Maria (after her mother), Christine (after her father), Anna (after the chapel where the baptism took place), Astrid (after her godmother and great-grandmother, Queen of the Belgians), Zita (after her ancestor, Empress Zita) and Charlotte (after her great-grandmother, the Charlotte, Grand Duchess of Luxembourg). Soon after her birth, the family moved to Geneva, where the Archduchess continued her studies. After graduating from school in Great Britain, she spent several months in Chile, where she was involved in charity work. After returning to Europe, she studied psychology, speech therapy, pedagogy and personal development in Belgium. In 2007 she worked in Beirut, the capital of Lebanon. Her engagement was announced on 16 May 2008 to Count Rodolphe Christian Léopold Carl Ludwig Philippe de Limburg-Stirum (b. 20 March 1979, Uccle, Brussels, Belgium), son of Count Christian and Countess Colienne de Limburg-Stirum. On 6 December 2008 married in a civil ceremony in Mechelen town hall, Mechelen, Belgium and then a religious ceremony at St. Rumbold's Cathedral in Mechelen, Belgium. They have three sons:
 Count Léopold Menno Philippe Gabriel François-Xavier Marie Joseph Ghislain de Limburg-Stirum (b. 19 April 2011, Buenos Aires, Argentina). His godparents are Count Philippe de Limburg-Stirum (his father's brother) and Archduchess Gabriella of Austria (his mother's sister).
 Count Constantin de Limburg-Stirum (b. 25 October 2013, Buenos Aires, Argentina).
 Count Gabriel de Limburg-Stirum (b. 2016).
 Archduke Imre Emanuel Simeon Jean Carl Marcus d'Aviano of Austria (b. 8 December 1985, Geneva, Switzerland). His engagement to Kathleen Elizabeth Walker, daughter of banker Robert Walker and his wife Margaret Walker, was announced on 22 December 2011. They met in April 2010. The couple got married on 8 December 2012 at Saint Mary, Mother of God Catholic Church, Washington, United States.They have four daughters:
 Archduchess Maria-Stella Elizabeth Christiana Yolande Alberta of Austria (b. 11 November 2013, Kirchberg, Luxembourg). She was baptized on 14 December 2013 in Fischbach.
 Archduchess Magdalena Maria Alexandra Zita Charlotte of Austria (b. 24 February 2016, Kirchberg, Luxembourg). She was baptized on 28 April 2016.
 Archduchess Juliana Marie Christine Wilhelmina Margaret Astrid of Austria (b. 14 October 2018, Geneva, Switzerland). She was baptized on 14 December 2018 in Combloux and her godparents were Will Conquer (her parents' friend) and Archduchess Marie-Christine of Austria (her father's sister).
 Archduchess Cecilia Marie Josephine Adelaide Henrietta of Austria (b. 15 January 2021, Geneva, Switzerland). She was baptized in February 2021.
 Archduke Christoph Henri Alexander Maria Marcus d' Aviano of Austria (b. 2 February 1988, Geneva, Switzerland), his godfather is Henri, Grand Duke of Luxembourg (his mother's brother). His engagement to Adélaïde Marie Béatrice Drapé-Frisch (b. 4 September 1989, Les Lilas, Paris, France), daughter of diplomat Philippe Drapé-Frisch and his wife Odile Drapé-Frisch, was announced on 22 December 2011. On 28 December 2012 the couple entered into a civil marriage in the town hall in Nancy and in a religious ceremony on 29 December 2012 at Basilica of Saint-Epvre (:fr:Basilique Saint-Epvre de Nancy) in Nancy, France.They have three children:
 Archduchess Katarina Marie-Christine Fabiola of Austria (b. 22 December 2014, Geneva, Switzerland). She was baptized on 27 December 2014 in Geneva, and her godparents were Galdric Drapé-Frisch (her mother's brother) and Archduchess Marie-Christine of Austria (her father's sister).
 Archduchess Sophia of Austria (b. 31 August 2017, Geneva, Switzerland).
 Archduke Josef of Austria (b. October 2020, Geneva, Switzerland).
 Archduke Alexander Hector Marie Karl Leopold Marcus d'Aviano of Austria (b. 26 September 1990, Meyrin, Switzerland).
 Archduchess Gabriella Maria Pilar Yolande Joséphine-Charlotte of Austria (b. 26 March 1994, Geneva, Switzerland). On 1 March 2008 she received the sacrament of confirmation. She is godmother to her nephew Count Léopold of Limburg-Stirum. She got engaged to Prince Henri Luitpold Antoine Victor Marie Joseph of Bourbon-Parma (b. 14 October 1991, Roskilde, Denmark), on 22 October 2017. The couple got married on 12 September 2020 at Tratzberg Castle, Jenbach, Tyrol, Austria.They have two daughters:
 Princess Victoria Antonia Marie-Astrid Lydia of Bourbon-Parma (b. 30 October 2017, Geneva, Switzerland).
 Princess Anastasia Erika Alexandra Marie Yolande of Bourbon-Parma (b. 3 July 2021, Geneva, Switzerland).

Archduchess Marie-Astrid and her family reside in Switzerland and live quietly, occasionally appearing at royal weddings and similar events.

Title and styles

Marie-Astrid is a  Princess of Luxembourg with the official style and title "Her Royal Highness Princess Marie-Astrid of Luxembourg, Princess of Bourbon-Parma".

17 February 1954 – 6 February 1982: Her Royal Highness Princess Marie-Astrid of Luxembourg, Princess of Bourbon-Parma.
6 February 1982 – present: Her Royal Highness Princess Marie-Astrid of Luxembourg, Princess of Bourbon-Parma, Archduchess Carl Christian of Austria.

Honours

National honours 

As Princess of Luxembourg, at 18 years old :
 : Knight Grand Cross of Order of Adolphe of Nassau (by birth, on 18 years old)
  : Commemorative Silver Jubilee Medal of His Royal Highness The Grand Duke Jean (12 November 1989).

Foreign honours 
 : Commemorative Medal of the 2500th Anniversary of the founding of the Persian Empire (14 October 1971).
 : Knight Grand Cross of the Order of Isabella the Catholic (8 July 1980).

References

1954 births
House of Nassau-Weilburg
Living people
Luxembourgian princesses
Princesses of Bourbon-Parma
People from Betzdorf, Luxembourg
Knights Grand Cross of the Order of Isabella the Catholic
Austrian nurses
Austrian people of Luxembourgian descent
Daughters of monarchs